The National Archives of Solomon Islands are located in Honiara.

See also 
 List of national archives

Solomon Islands
Organisations based in the Solomon Islands